The KOHAR Symphony Orchestra and Choir (frequently named and known as KOHAR) is a symphony orchestra and choir based in Gyumri, Armenia.

History
KOHAR was founded in 1997 as an independent musical and cultural institution by the Armenian culture patron Harout Khatchadourian of Lebanon, who along with his brothers, Shahe and Nar Khatchadourian, entirely sustained the activities of KOHAR and all its concerts, in tribute to, and in memory of, their late father Aram, and named the orchestra to honor their mother 'Kohar'.

KOHAR initially started as a symphony orchestra in the year 2000, playing the music of Armenia, and other popular songs and well-known symphonies, under the helm of Creative Director and Conductor Sebouh Abcarian of Cyprus. Later the KOHAR Choir was formed to complement the work of the KOHAR Symphony Orchestra.

KOHAR consisted of over 150 musicians and 12 solo singers, along with a 15 dance-member ensemble. The Symphony Orchestra & Choir quickly grew in popularity with its initial outdoor concerts on the premises of KOHAR in Lebanon, which attracted interest and admiration from locals and overseas visitors.

Break out tours
KOHAR's first major concert tour 'All Time Armenian Favourites', took place in the summer of 2002, in Cyprus and Lebanon, and it spread over four days. The concerts served as a distinctive cultural experience, drawing more than 4000 people to BIEL, downtown Beirut, which transformed the hall into a scenic, memorable and glorifying moment for Armenian musical history. According to media, the collection of traditional & popular songs "drew many into tears of nostalgia, reminiscence and pride".

International success
In October 2005, it was the turn for Istanbul, Turkey, to enjoy KOHAR’s All Time Armenian Favorites Tour.  On October 9–12, 2005, the concert was held at Lutfi Kirdar Concert Hall, with more than 7000 Armenians, and visiting audiences from Istanbul and the suburbs, and as far away as the Adana province attended.

KOHAR’s triumphs continued from one capital to another, and on 28–29 April 2006, the Grand Hall of the Kremlin, Moscow, witnessed unprecedented enthusiasm, when almost 12,000 Armenian, Russian and foreign audiences, relished KOHAR’s unique performance for the first time. It was a widely publicized rare appearance by an Armenian Orchestra in Russia, which was highly successful with the Russian audience.

KOHAR made its North American debut at the end of 2007, and conquered the major cities of the US and Canada. The North American Tour of KOHAR began on October 18, 2007, in Los Angeles, and moved to San Francisco, Detroit, Chicago, Boston, Toronto and Montreal, before ending with the conquering of New York’s Carnegie Hall on November 20, 2007.

KOHAR has continued to spread its message when touring the Middle East, commencing with the Syrian Arab Republic, and the first appearance on July 9, 2009, at  The Opera Theater of Damascus, followed by successful performances in the 15th, 16 and 17 July 2009, within the ancient fortress of the renowned world-heritage site of the Citadel of Aleppo.

KOHAR showcased its largest concert with Stars of Armenia at Liberty Square near the Opera House in the heart of Yerevan, Armenia on 28 May 2011.
The star-studded event brought together the most popular singers of Armenia who performed with KOHAR their much-loved songs that are admired by fans and audiences alike.

The live concert was broadcast live by Armenia’s Channel 1 TV and for the first time via Internet live stream.
Over 10,000 spectators, in addition to tens of thousands of TV and Internet viewers from Armenia and the Diaspora, were mesmerized by KOHAR’s performance of the finest tunes and the program which was dubbed as the biggest show ever performed in Armenia for its grandiose magnificent production.

KOHAR's latest production by HAYASA  Productions LTD of Cyprus and Domino Production of  Armenia boasted a superb 3D mapping and projection on the façade of the Opera House of images that transposed into Armenia’s history from Noah’s Ark to its national symbol Ararad, its rich Alphabet – the Ayp Pen Kim – reaching historic Armenian Kingdom of Cilicia. The culmination of the night was the performance of the song "Babenagan Guiliguia", which topped the charts in Armenia as the Number 1 song for 8 consecutive weeks. Together with KOHAR, the audience joined in the performance waving more than 3000 flags of Kingdom of Cilicia that were distributed by the organizers. A similar enthusiasm from the audience erupted with the song “Veraganknir Guiliguia,” which has become KOHAR’s anthem.

During the course of its existence, KOHAR has become an important cornerstone, with its unique musical renditions of Armenia's favorite songs, for the Armenian Diaspora. Aiming at reviving and promulgating the Armenian alphabet and culture, and bringing its share to preserving Armenian heritage for future generations at home and abroad.

Awards and acknowledgements
In 2004, KOHAR won the Intermedia Award at the World Media Festival in Hamburg, Germany In 2005, it also won the Anoush Achievement Award at the Seventh Annual Armenian Music Awards, held at the Hollywood Palladium, California.

Patron of Armenian culture, Harout Khatchadourian of Lebanon, was awarded at the presidential palace with the “Movses Khorenatsi” medal by President Serzh Sargsyan of Armenia on 17 September 2011 for his decades of continuous and dedicated cultural contribution in different Armenian Diasporas in safeguarding and promulgating Armenian music, song, culture, Ayp Pen Kim’s (Armenian alphabet).

References

Further reading

External links
 Official Website

Symphony orchestras
Armenian diaspora
Music organizations based in Armenia
Musical groups established in 1997
Gyumri